This is a list of all teams and players who have won the Connacht Senior Football Championship since its inception.

By year

References

Connacht Senior Football Championship
Gaelic football-related lists